The United People's Party Liberal ( UPPL) is a political party founded in Assam. The party has its headquarters in Kokrajhar Town. The party was actively participated in 2020 Bodoland Territorial Council Election under the presidency of Pramod Boro. Earlier the party was led by former MP Urkhao Gwra Brahma.

History 
The UPPL was formed on 5 August 2015 and the earlier name was Peoples Co-ordination for Democratic Right (PCDR). The party was formed with the ideology of working for the welfare of the people irrespective of caste, creed and religion.

Bharatiya Janata Party announced that it has agreed to support efforts by the UPPL to form an executive body in Bodoland Territorial Council. The leader of the UPPL, Pramod Boro became the new Chief Executive Member of the Bodoland Territorial Council on 15 December 2020.

Flag 
UPPL flag is tri-color having a yellow, white, and green color. The party symbol is Tractor and is put in the middle of the white background.

Electoral performance

State Legislative Assembly Elections

CEM of Bodoland Territorial Council

State Minister

Assam

References 

United People's Party Liberal
Political parties established in 2015
2015 establishments in India
Political parties in Assam
State political parties in Assam
Regionalist parties in India